The Financial District (Financial Core) is the central business district of Los Angeles along Olive, Grand, Hope, Flower and Figueroa streets from 4th Street to 8th Street. It is south of the Bunker Hill district, west of the Historic Core, north of South Park and east of the Harbor Freeway and Central City West. Like Bunker Hill, the Financial District is home to corporate office skyscrapers, hotels and related services as well as banks, law firms, and real estate companies. However, unlike Bunker Hill which was razed and now consists of buildings constructed since the 1960s, it contains large buildings from the early 20th century, particularly along Seventh Street, once the city's upscale shopping street; the area also attracts visitors as the 7th and Flower area is at the center of the regional Metro rail system and is replete with restaurants, bars, and shopping at two urban malls.

History
What is now the Financial District was originally agricultural land, then a residential area of single family homes, then around 1900 started attracting businesses as Victorian-era Downtown L.A. expanded south along Broadway past 3rd Street and "around the corner", west along Seventh Street. Around 1915, 7th Street between Broadway (on which corner stood Bullock's) and Figueroa Street, became downtown's upscale shopping district. This began with J. W. Robinson's deciding to build their flagship store in 1915 on Seventh far to the west of the existing Broadway shopping district, between Hope and Grand streets. The Ville de Paris and Coulter's as well as numerous specialty shops came and rounded out the district. The area lost its exclusivity when the upscale downtown stores opened branches in Hollywood, Mid-Wilshire, Westwood and Pasadena in the late 1920s through the 1940s, notably the establishment of Bullock's upscale landmark branch Bullocks Wilshire in Mid-Wilshire in 1929.

Thirteen large office buildings opened between 1920 and 1928. By 1929, every plot on 7th between Figueroa and Los Angeles Streets had been developed.

The area remained an important, if not the most exclusive, center of retail and office space throughout the 1950s, but started a slow decline throughout the 1980s due to suburbanization. It was also the concentration of Downtown financial activity on Bunker Hill, a few blocks north. The flagship department stores like Bullock's (1983), Barker Brothers (1984) and Robinson's (1993) had closed and only the Broadway/Macy's at The Bloc, previously named Broadway Plaza remained. However, in 1986, the Seventh Market Place mall, now FIGat7th, opened, bringing a smaller retail cluster back to Seventh such as the 7th Street/Metro Center station opening in 1991.

The Financial District was created by the Los Angeles Community Redevelopment Agency to provide an alternative to the old Spring Street Financial District, which fell into decline in the second half of the 20th century.

Demand for apartments in downtown Los Angeles surged in 2010 and the years following. In 2015, thousands of apartments were under construction or proposed for the area around 8th Street.

Historic photos

Transportation
The Los Angeles County Metropolitan Transportation Authority (Metro Rail & Metro Busway), and LADOT (DASH & Commuter Express) provide heavy rail (subway), light rail, and local bus services throughout the Financial Core and to the Greater Los Angeles Area.

7th St/Metro Center station provides primary access to Metro B Line, D Line, A Line, and E Line.

Landmarks

Landmarks in the district include, from west to east and north to south:

Fifth Street:
 Westin Bonaventure Hotel & Suites, block bounded by 4th, 5th, Figueroa, Flower; 404 S. Figueroa, opened 1976, John C. Portman, Jr., architect.
 FourFortyFour South Flower, formerly Citigroup Center, 48 floors, 191 m (627 ft.), NE corner of 5th and Flower, 444 S. Flower, opened 1981, Albert C. Martin & Associates, architects
 Richard J. Riordan Central Library (Los Angeles Public Library), south side of 5th at Hope, 630 W. 5th St., opened 1926, Bertram Grosvenor Goodhue, architect.
 Millennium Biltmore Hotel, on south side of 5th from Olive to Grand, facing Pershing Square, opened 1923
 Pershing Square, between 5th, 6th, Hill and Olive

Sixth Street:
 Figueroa at Wilshire, originally Sanwa Bank Plaza, 53 stories, 218.5m, 717 ft., SW corner 6th and Figueroa, 601 S. Figueroa, opened 1990, Albert C. Martin & Associates, architects.
 SW corner of 6th/Flower: Pacific Financial Center, 18 stories, 1973, architect William Pereira and Assoc. Site of Southland Hotel, opened 1910, demolished 1971.
 Superior Oil Company Building (The Standard Hotel, Downtown Los Angeles), NE corner 6th and Flower, 550 S. Flower, opened 1956, Claud Beelman and William Simpson, architects.
 611 Place, NW corner 6th and Grand.
 PacMutual Building, (originally the Pacific Mutual Building), northwest corner of 6th and Olive, completed in stages in 1908, 1921, 1926, 1936; architects Dodd & Richards and Parkinson & Bergstrom, Beaux-Arts and Moderne architecture.
 Aon Center, 67 floors, height 261.52 m (858.0 ft), W side of Hope between 6th and Wilshire, 707 Wilshire Bl., opened 1974, Charles Luckman, architect.
 James Oviatt Building, former home of Alexander & Oviatt men's clothing store, 6th and Olive

Seventh Street:
 Wilshire Grand Center a.k.a. Korean Air Tower, 73 floors, 335 m (1,100 ft.), occupying the block from Wilshire to 7th and from Figueroa to Francisco, 900 Wilshire Bl., opened 2017, AC Martin Partners, architects. Site of the 1952 Hotel Statler, later the Los Angeles Hilton.
 Ernst & Young Plaza, 41 floors, 163m, 534 ft., SW corner of 7th and Figueroa, 725 S. Figueroa, opened 1985
 Fine Arts Building, near NW corner 7th and Flower, 811 W. 7th, opened 1927, Albert Raymond Walker and Percy Augustus Eisen, architects.
 MCI Center (originally Broadway Plaza), 33 floors, 126 m (414 ft.), SE corner of 7th and Flower, 700 S. Flower, opened 1973, Luckman Partership, architects. The Bloc shopping center is located in the complex.
 Brockman Building, SE corner 7th and Grand, 520–530 W. 7th, opened 1912, Barnett, Haynes & Barnett, architects.
 City National Plaza, originally ARCO Plaza, twin towers, occupying the entire block from 5th to 6th and from Flower to Figueroa, 505–555 S. Flower, opened 1971, Albert C. Martin & Associates, architects
 Los Angeles Athletic Club, NE corner 7th and Olive, 431 W 7th, opened 1912, by John Parkinson and George Bergstrom, architects.

Eighth Street:
 777 Tower (originally Citicorp Plaza), 52 stories, NW corner 8th and Figueroa, 777 S. Figueroa, opened 1991; and the adjacent FIGat7th (originally Seventh Market Place) shopping center, opened in 1986.
 Southern California Gas Company Complex,  SE corner 8th and Flower, 800–830 S. Flower, first part opened 1925, Parkinson & Parkinson et al., architects. Six-story extension at 820 S. Flower: opened 1942, Robert V. Derrah architect.

Other:
 Jonathan Club

Map of buildings and historic sites

References

External links